The Phantom of the Opera is a musical with music by Andrew Lloyd Webber, lyrics by Charles Hart, and a libretto by Lloyd Webber and Richard Stilgoe. Based on the 1910 French novel of the same name by Gaston Leroux, it tells the story of a beautiful soprano, Christine Daaé, who becomes the obsession of a mysterious, masked musical genius living in the subterranean labyrinth beneath the Paris Opéra House.

The musical opened in London's West End in 1986 and on Broadway in New York in 1988, in a production directed by Harold Prince and starring English classical soprano Sarah Brightman (Lloyd Webber's then-wife) as Christine Daaé, Michael Crawford as the Phantom, and Steve Barton as Raoul. It won the 1986 Olivier Award and the 1988 Tony Award for Best Musical, with Crawford winning the Olivier and Tony for Best Actor in a Musical. A film adaptation, directed by Joel Schumacher, was released in 2004 starring Gerard Butler in the titular role, alongside Emmy Rossum and Patrick Wilson.

Phantom is currently the longest running show in Broadway history, and celebrated its 10,000th Broadway performance on 11 February 2012, the first production ever to do so. The original West End production remains the second longest-running West End musical, after Les Misérables, and the third longest-running West End show overall, after The Mousetrap. With total estimated worldwide gross receipts of over $6 billion and total Broadway gross of over $1 billion, Phantom was the most financially successful entertainment event until The Lion King surpassed it in 2014. By 2019, it had been seen by over 140 million people in 183 cities across 41 countries. The Broadway production is scheduled to close on April 16, 2023.

Development

Idea
In 1984, Lloyd Webber contacted Cameron Mackintosh, the co-producer of Cats and Song and Dance, to propose a new musical. He was aiming for a romantic piece, and suggested Gaston Leroux's book The Phantom of the Opera as a basis. They screened both the 1925 Lon Chaney and the 1943 Claude Rains motion picture versions, but neither saw any effective way to make the leap from film to stage. Later, in New York, Lloyd Webber found a second-hand copy of the original, long-out-of-print Leroux novel, which supplied the necessary inspiration to develop a musical: said Lloyd Webber, "I was actually writing something else at the time, and I realised that the reason I was hung up was because I was trying to write a major romantic story, and I had been trying to do that ever since I started my career. Then with the Phantom, it was there!"

Lyricists 
Lloyd Webber first approached Jim Steinman to write the lyrics because of his "dark obsessive side", but he declined in order to fulfill his commitments on a Bonnie Tyler album. Alan Jay Lerner (1918—1986) was then recruited, but he became seriously ill after joining the project and was forced to withdraw; none of his contributions (mostly involving the song "Masquerade") are credited in the show. Richard Stilgoe, the lyricist for Starlight Express, was then hired and wrote most of the original lyrics for the show. However, Charles Hart, a young and then-relatively unknown lyricist, later rewrote many of the lyrics, along with original lyrics for "Think of Me". Some of Stilgoe's original contributions are still present in the final version nevertheless. Phantom is primarily a sung-through musical with very little spoken dialogue.

Score
Inspired in part by an earlier musical version of the same story by Ken Hill, Lloyd Webber's score is sometimes operatic in style but maintains the form and structure of a musical throughout. The full-fledged operatic passages are reserved principally for subsidiary characters such as André and Firmin, Carlotta, and Piangi. They are also used to provide the content of the fictional operas that are taking place within the show itself, viz., Hannibal, Il Muto, and the Phantom's masterwork, Don Juan Triumphant. "Here, Lloyd Webber pastiched various styles from the grand operas of Meyerbeer through to Mozart and even Gilbert and Sullivan." These pieces are often presented as musical fragments, interrupted by dialogue or action sequences in order to clearly define the musical's "show within a show" format.

The musical extracts from the Phantom's opera, "Don Juan Triumphant", heard during the latter stages of the show, are dissonant and modern—"suggesting, perhaps, that the Phantom is ahead of his time artistically".

Design, direction, and choreography
Maria Björnson designed the sets and over 200 costumes, including the elaborate gowns in the "Masquerade" sequence. Her set designs, including the chandelier, subterranean gondola, and sweeping staircase, earned her multiple awards. Hal Prince, director of Cabaret, Candide, Follies, and Lloyd Webber's Evita, directed the production, while Gillian Lynne, associate director and choreographer of Cats, provided the integral musical staging and choreography.

West End and Broadway

First preview at Sydmonton
A preview of the first act was staged at Sydmonton Court (Lloyd Webber's home) in 1985, starring Colm Wilkinson (later the star of the Toronto production) as the Phantom, Sarah Brightman as Kristin (later Christine), and Clive Carter (later a member of the London cast) as Raoul. This very preliminary production used Richard Stilgoe's original unaltered lyrics, and many songs sported names that were later changed, such as "What Has Time Done to Me" ("Think of Me"), and "Papers" ("Notes"). The Phantom's original mask covered the entire face and remained in place throughout the performance, obscuring the actor's vision and muffling his voice. Maria Björnson designed the now-iconic half-mask to replace it, and the unmasking sequence was added. Clips of this preview performance were included on the DVD of the 2004 film production.

West End
Phantom began previews at Her Majesty's Theatre in London's West End on 27 September 1986 under the direction of Hal Prince, then opened on 9 October. It was choreographed by Gillian Lynne and the sets were designed by Maria Björnson, with lighting by Andrew Bridge. Michael Crawford starred in the title role with Sarah Brightman as Christine and Steve Barton as Raoul. The production, which played at Her Majesty's Theatre, celebrated its 10,000th performance on 23 October 2010, with Lloyd Webber and the original Phantom, Crawford, in attendance. At the time of its closure in 2020, it was the second longest-running musical in West End (and world) history behind Les Misérables, and third overall behind The Mousetrap. The production ran for 13,629 performances, with its final performance taking place on 14 March 2020, prior to the shutdown of theatres resulting from the COVID-19 pandemic.

A 25th-anniversary stage performance was held in London on 1 and 2 October 2011 at the Royal Albert Hall and was screened live in cinemas worldwide. The production was produced by Cameron Mackintosh, directed by Laurence Connor, musical staging & choreography by Gillian Lynne, set design by Matt Kinley, costume design by Maria Björnson, lighting design by Patrick Woodroffe, and sound design by Mick Potter. The cast included Ramin Karimloo as the Phantom, Sierra Boggess as Christine, Hadley Fraser as Raoul, Wynne Evans as Piangi, Wendy Ferguson as Carlotta, Barry James as Monsieur Firmin, Gareth Snook as Monsieur Andre, Liz Robertson as Madame Giry, and Daisy Maywood as Meg Giry. Lloyd Webber and several original cast members, including Crawford and Brightman, were in attendance. A DVD and Blu-ray of the performance was released in February 2012, and it began airing in March 2012 on PBS's "Great Performances" television series.

In March 2012, a new production directed by Laurence Connor began a UK and Ireland tour to commemorate the 25th anniversary of the show, beginning at the Theatre Royal Plymouth and travelled to Manchester, Bristol, Dublin, Leeds, Edinburgh, Milton Keynes, Cardiff, and Southampton. John Owen-Jones and Earl Carpenter alternated as the Phantom, with Katie Hall as Christine and Simon Bailey as Raoul. The 30th anniversary was on 10 October 2016 with a special appearance of the original cast during the curtain call.

In November 2019, the co-producers of Phantom, Mackintosh and Lloyd Webber's Really Useful Group (RUG), announced that the show would again tour the UK and Ireland, but this time with a return to the original production rather than the 2012 production. Although this announcement stated that the tour would be an "exact replica" of the musical on Broadway and in the West End, alterations were made to the set design in order to make the tour "lighter". These included a scaling down of the production's false proscenium, with the centrepiece Angel statue designed by Maria Björnson removed. Performances of this latest 2020 tour, together with the original London production at Her Majesty's Theatre, were both suspended from 16 March 2020 as a result of the COVID-19 pandemic. In May 2020, Mackintosh and RUG announced the premature closure of the tour as a result.

The following month, it was announced that an extended closure of the original London production would be required to refurbish the sets and the theatre. In July 2020, social media outlets posted photographs of the sets, props, and costumes being loaded out from Her Majesty's Theatre. As Mackintosh had only recently closed the original 1985 London production of Les Misérables in order to replace it with a newer production that had previously toured the UK, speculation mounted that the original production of Phantom was to be overhauled or replaced entirely. Confirmation of this speculation was given on 28 July 2020, when Mackintosh announced that he and Lloyd Webber had decided to "permanently close" the original London production after a 33-year run, but that the two were "determined" for the musical to return to the West End.

In response to this announcement, the Really Useful Group denied that the original production was permanently closing, stating that the extended closure was simply to enable a refurbishment of the theatre and that the show would return "unchanged" and any returning production would "not be a new version of the show", but without confirming upon request by The Stage as to whether the production's 27-piece orchestra would return. In October 2020, Mackintosh contradicted this clarification by stating that the "new version" based on the 2020 UK tour would in fact be the production that would be staged at Her Majesty's Theatre post-pandemic.

Mackintosh confirmed in an interview on 4 December 2020 that the original London staging had officially ended, with investors having been given their closing notices, and that the 2020 tour would be moved into the show's original home at Her Majesty's Theatre. Lloyd Webber and Mackintosh announced a planned reopening on 27 July 2021. Planning documentation submitted by LW Theatres confirmed considerable redesigns of Maria Björnson's set, with the removal of the Angel statue and fewer gargoyles on the proscenium as had featured in the original production. It was additionally confirmed on 12 April 2021 that, contrary to claims by Lloyd Webber that the original production would return "in its entirety", the orchestra of the original production (once the largest for any West End musical) was to be halved for the show's return to the West End using the reduced tour orchestrations. On 15 April 2021, Mackintosh confirmed that the original staging would not be reinstated at Her Majesty's Theatre and that the designs of Maria Björnson, direction of Hal Prince, and choreography of Gillian Lynne would be "reimagined by a new team". The producer reconfirmed in an interview with the Daily Telegraph in April 2021 that the 2020 reduced touring redesigns would replace the originals at Her Majesty's Theatre. Full casting for the reopening was announced on 27 April 2021, with all previous longtime cast members having departed the show.

2021 West End Production
The current West End production opened at Her Majesty's Theatre, where the musical had originally premiered in 1986, on 27 July 2021. Ticket sales currently run until 30 September 2023.

Although Lloyd Webber described the show as "substantially identical" to the original production, changes were made to the show's set design by Matt Kinley. This included, among other modifications, the loss of Maria Björnson's sculptures covering the sides of the proscenium (previously described by Harold Prince as the "key to the show") and the levitating Angel statue during the "All I Ask of You" sequence (replaced by a replica of Lequesne's La Renommée retenant Pégase that appears on the stage). Other sequences, including that of the descent to the lair (in which doubles of the Phantom and Christine were excised, previously mobile candelabra became stationary, and the number of candles populating the lake were reduced), were also restaged by Seth Sklar-Heyn. Whereas Prince had envisioned the show as a "black box" production requiring the use of black velour and paint around the proscenium, this was removed as part of the restoration to Her Majesty's Theatre, with once blacked-out stage boxes returned to their original green and red colours and reintroduced for audience use. Gillian Lynne's original choreography was revised by Chrissie Cartwright. The orchestra was reduced to 14 players from the original 27.

The show reopened with Killian Donnelly as the Phantom, Lucy St. Louis as Christine, Rhys Whitfield as Raoul, Saori Oda as Carlotta, and other cast members from the aborted 2020 UK tour.

New casting was announced on 18 January with Earl Carpenter and Jon Robyns starring as the Phantom respectively from 13 February to Saturday 1 April and from 3 April 2023, and Holly-Anne Hull starring as Christine Daae from 23 January.

Broadway

Phantom began Broadway previews at the Majestic Theatre on 9 January 1988 and opened on 26 January. Lloyd Webber had hoped to open in Toronto prior to Broadway, but political pressure forced the change. Crawford, Brightman, and Barton reprised their respective roles from the West End. The production continues to play at the Majestic, where it became the first Broadway musical in history to surpass 10,000 performances on 11 February 2012. On 26 January 2013, the production celebrated its 25th anniversary with its 10,400th performance. It is, by over 3,500 performances, the longest-running show in Broadway history. The 30th anniversary was on 26 January 2018 with special activities and an extra performance during the week. By April 2019, Phantom had been staged over 13,000 times.

Critical reviews were mostly positive on opening. The New York Times Frank Rich writes: "It may be possible to have a terrible time at The Phantom of the Opera, but you'll have to work at it. Only a terminal prig would let the avalanche of pre-opening publicity poison his enjoyment of this show, which usually wants nothing more than to shower the audience with fantasy and fun, and which often succeeds, at any price." Howard Kissel from New York Daily News commended the production, calling it "a spectacular entertainment, visually the most impressive of the British musicals", and praised Lloyd Webber's score despite its "synthetic, borrowed quality" as well as Michael Crawford's "powerful" performance. Maria Björnson's set and costume design in particular garnered critical acclaim, with reviewers calling it "a breathtaking, witty, sensual tribute to 19th century theater" as well as "marvels of period atmospheric detail and technical savvy".

On 12 March 2020, the show suspended production due to the COVID-19 pandemic,and resumed performances on 22 October 2021. Unlike the West End production, the Broadway show returned with the original Harold Prince-directed production and Maria Björnson's original set and costume designs. After Prince's death in 2019, his daughter Daisy, who is also a theater director, began serving as an informal advisor for the production.

The production struggled to return to pre-pandemic attendance levels after its return. In September 2022, it was scheduled to close on 18 February 2023, shortly after its 35th anniversary. After this announcement, attendance surged, and the closing was pushed back to April 16, 2023.

Synopsis

Prologue
In the year 1919, the Paris Opéra House hosts an auction of old theatre memorabilia. Among the attendees is an aged Viscount Raoul de Chagny, who purchases Lot 665, a papier-mâché music box with a monkey figurine. He eyes it sadly, cryptically observing that it appears "exactly as she said". The next lot – Lot 666 –  is a broken chandelier, portions of which have been renovated with electrical wiring. The auctioneer states that this chandelier was involved in a famous disaster, connected to "the strange affair of the Phantom of the Opera, a mystery never fully explained". He commands the auction assistants to turn on the power and light up the chandelier for all to see. As the overture plays, it flickers to life and ascends to the ceiling, as a transition back in time restores the opera house to its former grandeur ("Overture").

Act I
The year is 1881 – the cast of a new production, Hannibal, is rehearsing ("Hannibal Rehearsal"). Carlotta, the Opéra's resident soprano prima donna, begins to perform an aria when a backdrop inexplicably falls from the flies, causing anxious chorus girls to shout, "He's here! The Phantom of the Opera!" The new owners, Firmin and André, try to downplay the incident, but Carlotta angrily storms offstage. Madame Giry, the Opéra's ballet mistress, suggests that Christine Daaé, a chorus girl and orphaned daughter of a prominent Swedish violinist, has been "well taught" and can sing Carlotta's role. As their only alternative is cancelling the sold-out show, the managers reluctantly audition her, and discover that she is indeed talented. As Christine sings the aria during the evening performance, the Opéra's new patron, Raoul, Vicomte de Chagny, recognizes her as his childhood friend and playmate ("Think of Me").

Backstage after her triumphant debut, Christine confesses to her friend, Madame Giry's daughter Meg, that her singing has been inspired by an unseen tutor she knows only as the "Angel of Music" ("Angel of Music").  Raoul visits Christine in her dressing room and the two reminisce about "Angel of Music" stories that her late father used to tell them. Christine confides that the Angel has visited her and taught her to sing ("Little Lotte"). Raoul indulges what he assumes are fantasies and insists on taking Christine to dinner. When Raoul leaves to fetch his hat, Christine hears the jealous Phantom's voice and entreats him to reveal himself. The Phantom obliges by appearing in her mirror ("The Mirror/Angel of Music (Reprise)"). Christine is irresistibly drawn through the mirror to the Phantom, who leads her down into the shadowy sewers below the Opéra house. The two board a small boat and cross a subterranean lake to his secret lair ("The Phantom of the Opera").  The Phantom explains that he has chosen Christine to sing his musical compositions. A mirror reflects an image of her in a wedding dress; when the mirror image spreads its arms towards the real Christine, she faints from shock. The Phantom lays her on a bed and covers her tenderly with his cloak ("The Music of the Night").

As the Phantom is composing music at his organ, Christine awakens to the sound of the monkey music box ("I Remember"). She slips behind the Phantom, lifts his mask, and beholds his disfigured face. The Phantom rails at her prying, then ruefully expresses his longing to be loved ("Stranger Than You Dreamt It"). Moved by pity, Christine returns the mask to the Phantom, and he escorts her back above ground.

Meanwhile, Joseph Buquet, the Opéra's chief stagehand, regales the chorus girls with tales of the "Opéra Ghost" and his terrible Punjab lasso. Madame Giry warns Buquet to restrain himself ("Magical Lasso"). In the manager's office, she delivers a note from the Phantom: he demands that Christine replace Carlotta as the Countess in the new opera, Il Muto ("Notes").  Firmin and André assure the furious Carlotta that she will remain the star ("Prima Donna").

The première of Il Muto initially goes well, until the Phantom suddenly enchants Carlotta's voice, reducing it to a frog-like croak. Firmin rushes to defuse the situation by announcing to the audience that Christine will take over the starring role, and he instructs the conductor to bring the ballet forward to keep the audience entertained. Suddenly, the corpse of Joseph Buquet drops from the rafters, hanging from the Punjab lasso. Mayhem erupts and the Phantom's evil laugh is heard throughout the auditorium ("Poor Fool, He Makes Me Laugh").

In the ensuing chaos, Christine escapes with Raoul to the rooftop and tells him about her subterranean encounter with the Phantom ("Why Have You Brought Me Here?/Raoul, I've Been There"). Raoul is skeptical but promises to love and protect her ("All I Ask of You"). The Phantom, who overheard their conversation, is heartbroken and swears revenge on them both.  In the auditorium, the chandelier crashes onto the stage during the Il Muto curtain call ("All I Ask of You (Reprise)").

Act II

Six months later, the Opera house hosts a masquerade ball. The Phantom, who has been conspicuously absent since the chandelier disaster, appears in costume as the Red Death. He announces that he has written an opera entitled Don Juan Triumphant, and demands that it be produced with Christine (who is now engaged to Raoul) in the lead role. He pulls Christine's engagement ring from the chain around her neck and vanishes in a flash of light ("Masquerade/Why So Silent").

Raoul accosts Madame Giry and demands that she reveal what she knows about the Phantom. She reluctantly explains that the Phantom is a brilliant scholar, magician, architect, inventor, and composer, who was born with a deformed face. Feared and reviled by society, he was cruelly exhibited in a cage as part of a travelling fair until he eventually escaped and took refuge beneath the opera house.

Raoul plots to use the première of Don Juan Triumphant to trap the Phantom and end his reign of terror, knowing he will attend the opera's debut. He begs Christine to help lure the Phantom into the trap ("Notes/Twisted Every Way"). Torn between her love for Raoul and her awe of the Phantom, Christine visits her father's grave, begging for his guidance ("Wishing You Were Somehow Here Again"). The Phantom appears atop the mausoleum ("Wandering Child"). Christine begins to succumb to the Phantom's influence, but Raoul arrives to rescue her. The Phantom taunts Raoul, hurling fire balls at him until Christine begs Raoul to leave with her. Furious, the Phantom declares war upon them both.

Don Juan Triumphant premieres with Christine and Piangi, the house tenor, singing the respective lead roles of Aminta and Don Juan. During Don Juan and Aminta's duet, Christine realizes that the Phantom has somehow replaced Piangi ("Don Juan Triumphant/The Point of No Return"). She calmly removes his mask, revealing his deformed face to the horrified audience. Exposed, the Phantom hurriedly drags Christine off the stage and back to his lair. Piangi's garrotted body is revealed backstage and the opera house plunges into chaos. An angry mob, vowing vengeance for the murders of Buquet and Piangi, search for the Phantom. Madame Giry tells Raoul how to find the Phantom's subterranean lair and warns him to beware the magical lasso ("Down Once More/Track Down This Murderer").

In the lair, the Phantom forces Christine to don a wedding dress. Raoul comes to the rescue and is ensnared in the Punjab lasso. The Phantom offers Christine an ultimatum: if she will stay with him, he will spare Raoul, but if she refuses, Raoul will die ("The Point of No Return Reprise"). Christine  tells the Phantom that he's not alone and kisses him.

Having experienced both kindness and compassion for the first time, the Phantom frees Raoul. He also tells Christine that he loves her and she tearfully exits the lair with Raoul. As the angry search mob closes in, the Phantom huddles on his throne beneath his cloak. Meg is the first to enter the lair. She approaches the Phantom's throne and pulls away the cloak, finding only his mask ("Finale").

Casting

Original casts
The original casts of the major productions of The Phantom of the Opera:

Notable replacements

West End (1986– )
The Phantom: Simon Bowman, Earl Carpenter, Killian Donnelly, Ben Forster, Peter Jöback, Ramin Karimloo, Peter Karrie, Ben Lewis, Marcus Lovett, John Owen-Jones, Peter Polycarpou, Jon Robyns, David Thaxton, Dave Willetts, Steve Barton (u/s)
Christine: Gina Beck, Rebecca Caine, Celia Graham, Katie Hall, Holly-Anne Hull, Claire Moore, Lucy St. Louis
Raoul: Michael Ball, John Barrowman, Simon Bowman, Clive Carter, Killian Donnelly, Ramin Karimloo, Sean Palmer, Michael Xavier 
André: Martin Ball
Firmin: Michael N. Harbour, Barry James, Bruce Montague

Broadway (1988–2023)
The Phantom: James Barbour, Steve Barton, Ben Crawford, John Cudia, Davis Gaines, Kevin Gray, Cris Groenendaal, Mark Jacoby, Peter Jöback, Norm Lewis, Brad Little, Peter Lockyer, Marcus Lovett, Laird Mackintosh, Gary Mauer, Howard McGillin, Timothy Nolen, Thomas James O'Leary, Hugh Panaro, Tim Martin Gleason (u/s)
Christine: Sierra Boggess, Ali Ewoldt, Rebecca Luker, Meghan Picerno, Julia Udine, Lisa Vroman
Raoul: John Cudia, Jordan Donica, Jason Forbach, Davis Gaines, Tim Martin Gleason, Jay Armstrong Johnson, Brad Little, Gary Mauer, Hugh Panaro, Cris Groenendaal (u/s), Aaron Lazar (u/s), Peter Lockyer (u/s)
André: George Lee Andrews, Bradley Dean, Laird Mackintosh, Peter Lockyer (u/s)
Firmin: George Lee Andrews, Tim Jerome
Madame Giry: Linda Balgord

Musical numbers

Prologue
 Overture – Orchestra

Act I
 "Hannibal Dress Rehearsal" – Carlotta, Piangi, Reyer, Lefevre, André, Firmin, Madame Giry, Meg, Buquet, Ensemble
 "Think of Me" – Christine, Raoul
 "Angel of Music" – The Phantom, Meg, Christine
 "Little Lotte" – Raoul, Christine
 "The Mirror/Angel of Music (Reprise)" – The Phantom, Christine, Raoul
 "The Phantom of the Opera" – Christine, The Phantom
 "The Music of the Night" – The Phantom
 "I Remember/Stranger Than You Dreamt It" – Christine, The Phantom
 "Magical Lasso" – Buquet, Madame Giry, Meg
 "Notes/Prima Donna" – André, Firmin, Raoul, Carlotta, Madame Giry, Meg, Piangi, The Phantom
 "Il Muto/Poor Fool, He Makes Me Laugh" – Carlotta, Piangi, The Phantom, Ensemble
 "Why Have You Brought Me Here/Raoul, I've Been There" – Raoul, Christine
 "All I Ask of You" – Raoul, Christine
 "All I Ask of You (Reprise)" – The Phantom

Act II
 Entr'acte – Orchestra
 "Masquerade" – André, Firmin, Ensemble
 "Why So Silent" – The Phantom
 "Notes/Twisted Every Way" – André, Firmin, Carlotta, Piangi, Raoul, Christine, Madame Giry, The Phantom
 "Don Juan Triumphant Rehearsal" – Christine, Piangi, Reyer, Carlotta, Madame Giry, Ensemble
 "Wishing You Were Somehow Here Again" – Christine
 "Wandering Child/Bravo, Monsieur..." – The Phantom, Christine, Raoul
 "Don Juan Triumphant" – Carlotta, Piangi, Christine, Ensemble
 "The Point of No Return" – The Phantom, Christine
 "Down Once More/Track Down This Murderer" – The Phantom, Madame Giry, Raoul, Ensemble
 "Finale" – Christine, The Phantom, Raoul, Ensemble
Source

Orchestra
The original orchestrations were written by David Cullen and Lloyd Webber.

There are several orchestrations:
27-piece (the original score, used currently on Broadway and until 2020 in London, also used for the 2022 Australian production)
29-piece (the original Broadway score)
14-piece (used on tour, most international productions from 2012 onwards, the 2020 UK Tour and in the 2021 London production)
45-piece (used for the 25th anniversary)

The original London score is as the Broadway score but with 1 percussion part and 7 violins. The current Broadway orchestration is licensed by R&H Theatricals for amateur and professional productions. The only difference between the Broadway 29- and 27-piece orchestras is the smaller orchestra's lack of Violins VII & VIII.

The Broadway production originally used a 29-piece pit orchestra:

Percussion is split between two books – regular percussion and mallets:
 2 timpani, suspended cymbals, crash cymbals, snare drum, triangle, tambourine, bass drum
 Glockenspiel, xylophone, vibes, marimba, tubular bells, bell tree, woodblock, gong, guiro, finger cymbals

Recordings
Cast recordings have been made of the London, Austrian, Dutch, German, Japanese, Swedish, Korean, Hungarian, Mexican, Polish, Russian and Canadian productions.

The recording of the 1986 original London cast, released by Polydor Records in 1987, was released in both a single-CD Highlights from The Phantom of the Opera and a two-CD Phantom of the Opera, both of which have been certified 4× Platinum in the US and sold 4.97 million copies as of January 2017. "The Complete Recordings" edition has sold 507,000 copies since 1991. Phantom was also certified 3× Platinum in the UK. The Canadian cast recording went 2× Platinum in Canada. In Switzerland, Phantom was certified 3× Platinum and Highlights was certified 2× Platinum. Recordings of the Vienna cast and the Hamburg cast produced by Jimmy Bowien were certified Gold and triple Platinum, respectively, in Germany. The original album recording has sold an alleged 40 million copies worldwide.

A live recording of The Phantom of the Opera at the Royal Albert Hall was released in the UK on 15 November 2011 and subsequently in the US and Canada on 7 February 2012, along with Blu-ray and DVD videos, and a collectors' box set of the Royal Albert concert, the original cast recording, and the sequel, Love Never Dies.

Sales and certifications

Original 1986 London production

Local productions

Highlights from The Phantom of the Opera

Allegations of plagiarism
In 1987, the heirs of Giacomo Puccini charged in a lawsuit that a recurring two-bar passage in "Music of the Night" closely resembled a similar phrase first heard in the aria "Quello che tacete" from Puccini's opera La fanciulla del West. The litigation was settled out of court for an undisclosed amount.

In 1990, a Baltimore songwriter named Ray Repp filed a lawsuit alleging that the title song from Phantom was based on a song that he wrote in 1978 called "Till You". After eight years of litigation – including an unsuccessful countersuit by Lloyd Webber claiming that "Till You" was itself a plagiarism of "Close Every Door" from Joseph and the Amazing Technicolor Dreamcoat – the jury found in Lloyd Webber's favour.

Former Pink Floyd vocalist and bassist Roger Waters has claimed that the signature descending/ascending half-tone chord progression from Phantom's title song was plagiarised from the bass line of a track on the 1971 Pink Floyd album Meddle called "Echoes". He avoided taking legal action, saying, "Life's too long to bother with suing Andrew fucking Lloyd Webber."

Other productions
Phantom has been translated into several languages and produced in over 40 countries on 6 continents. With some exceptions like the 25th Anniversary UK and US Tours, these productions have all been "clones", using the original staging, direction, sets, and costume concepts. Notable international productions include the following:
 Argentina: The show ran from March to November 2009 in Buenos Aires at the Teatro Opera.
 Australia: 1990–1998: Melbourne, Sydney, Brisbane, Adelaide, and Perth; 2007–2009: Melbourne, Brisbane, Sydney, Auckland, Perth and Adelaide, both starring Anthony Warlow. Brian Stacey was the original conductor of the first Australian production. Marina Prior starred as Christine in the original production, where Rob Guest later took over the title role. The final leg of the recent tour was staged in Adelaide in an arena format featuring giant screens on either side of the stage that presented footage shot simultaneously with the performance. 2013: Canberra starring Michael Cormick as The Phantom and with Julie Lea Goodwin starring as Christine from 9 to 23 August 2013. Goodwin had previously played the role, as the "Alternate Christine", in the 2007 to 2009 national tour. An outdoor production at the Sydney Harbour with all new sets, costumes and direction ran from March to April 2022.
 Austria: The German language production premiered at the Theater an der Wien in December 1988, running until June 1993.
 Brazil: The first Brazilian production premiered in São Paulo in April 2005 and closed in April 2007. The revival began 1 August 2018 in São Paulo at the Teatro Renault.
 Canada: The Canadian production of Phantom ran from 20 September 1989 to 31 October 1999 in Toronto at the Pantages Theatre, with Colm Wilkinson originating the role of Phantom. The Canadian International Touring Company toured the musical in Canada, Hawaii, Alaska, Hong Kong, and Singapore from 11 March 1991 to October 1995. The Music Box Tour (third US national tour) played dates across Canada in 2006–2007 including Calgary, Vancouver, Edmonton, Winnipeg, Toronto, Saskatoon and Ottawa.
 China: The Shanghai production played 97 performances at the Shanghai Grand Theatre. The world tour had their sixth season at the Culture Plaza Theatre at Shanghai Culture Square from 3 December 2013 to 26 January 2014. The world tour returned to China at the Guangzhou Opera House in Guangzhou from 26 September to 10 October 2015 and performed its final season at the Tianqiao Performing Arts Center in Beijing from 17 November 2015 to 10 January 2016.
 Czech Republic: The GoJA Music Hall Theater in Prague had a non-replica production, beginning September 2014. The revival began in September 2018 and a planned finish in June 2019.
 Denmark: First production was in Copenhagen in 2000 and the second ran from January to May 2009. The third began in September 2018, also in Copenhagen.
 Estonia: Production in Estonian language (but with English and Finnish subtitles) featuring original sets, costumes, and direction premiered on 4 October 2014 at Theatre Vanemuine in Tartu. In first season 2014/2015 there were 24 performances in total, eight of which took place in capital Tallinn at Nordea Concert Hall (premiered there on 30 October 2014). In spring 2017 there will be further 12 performances (two of which in Tallinn).
 Finland: A Finnish production premiered in Helsinki in 2015 at the Finnish National Opera in English. The revival began in November 2018. A second revival began in October 2021.
 Germany: Das Phantom der Oper played at the musical theatre Neue Flora (later renamed to Stage Theater Neue Flora) in Hamburg from 1990 to 2001, the Palladium Theatre in Stuttgart from 2002 to 2004, and at the Colosseum Theater in Essen from 2005 to 2007. A second Hamburg production ran from December 2013 until September 2015 at the Neue Flora theatre. A production in Oberhausen was running at the Metronom Theater from 17 November 2015 until September 2016.
 Hungary: Madách Theatre, Budapest. This production, which began in 2003, was the first to modify the original staging with new sets, costumes and direction. The five hundredth performance on 20 September 2007 featured four successive sets of casts.
 Japan: A Japanese production opened in Tokyo in 1988, and has since played in other Japanese cities.
 Malta: The Maltese concert premiere was in October 2017 produced by Grapevine Music in English as a non-replica with special arrangement with Really Useful Group. It was staged as a large arena event at the Malta Fairs and Conventions Centre (MFCC) for 2 packed performances of 5000 people each. It boasted a 45 piece Orchestra directed by Ryan Paul Abela and featured Roger Tirazona as the Phantom, Nadia Vella as Christine, Ashley Stillburn as Raoul, Stefania Grech Vella as Carlotta and many more.
 Mexico: The show had its Mexican premiere on 16 December 1999, in Spanish in Mexico City.
 Netherlands: A production in Scheveningen began in August 1993 and closed in August 1996 with Henk Poort as the title role.
 New Zealand: Opened at the Aotea Centre in Auckland in 1997 and at The Civic, The Edge-Auckland in 2008. A local production (with new designs) opened on 13 June at the St. James Theatre in Wellington and closed on 16 July 2013.
 Norway: A non-replica production opened for the first time in Oslo in September 2018.
 Panama: For the first time in Central America, El Fantasma de la Opera played in Spanish at the Teatro Anayansi of the Atlapa Convention Center from 23 to 25 September 2016, directed by Aaron Zebede. Randy Dominguez starred in the role of The Phantom, with Maria Fernanda Achurra as Christine and Leo Almengor as Raoul.
 Poland: The Polish production opened at the Roma Theater in Warsaw in March 2008 and closed in June 2010.
 Romania: The Romanian premiere was in January 2015 produced by the Romanian National Opereta. This new non-replica production was performed in Romanian with a local cast led by a British creative team.
 Russia: Moscow production co-produced by Stage Entertainment and Really Useful Group premiered on 4 October 2014 in the MDM theatre starring Ivan Ozhogin and Dmitry Yermak as The Phantom. The stalls and the stage were modernised specially for the production. The premiere was attended by Richard Stilgoe and Charles Hart.
 Serbia: The Serbian premiere was in October 2017 produced by Belgrade-based Terazije Theatre. The non-replica production was performed in Serbian with a local cast.
 Singapore: First tour at the Kallang Theatre from 26 February 1995 to 20 May 1995, second tour at the Esplanade – Theatres on the Bay from 23 March 2007 to 20 May 2007.
 South Korea: Two productions in Korean; first in December 2001 and the second on 2009. The world tour had two shows in Seoul in 2005 and December 2012.
 Spain: The Spanish production opened in Madrid on 4 September 2002 and closed on 30 June 2004.
 Sweden: First production premiered in Stockholm 1989 and the second one in September 2016
 Turkey: The world tour played in Istanbul at the Zorlu Center PSM from 7 April to 17 May 2015.
Thailand: World tour production opened in Bangkok on 7 May 2013 and closed on 9 June 2013 at Muangthai Rachadalai Theatre.
 United States: Los Angeles (1989–1993), San Francisco (1993–1999). A US national tour commenced in 1992 in Seattle and closed on 31 October 2010 at the Pantages Theatre in Hollywood, California, after nearly two decades. The closing night performance was attended by many former cast and crew members, including Andrew Lloyd Webber and Sarah Brightman.
 World tour: The Phantom of the Opera embarked on a world tour in February 2019, featuring Jonathan Roxmouth as the Phantom, Meghan Picerno as Christine, and Matt Leisy as Raoul. The first leg of the tour began in Manila at the Theatre at Solaire on 20 February 2019 and closed its Manila leg on 6 April 2019. The cast was also set to perform in Singapore, Kuala Lumpur, Tel Aviv, and Dubai for the succeeding legs of the tour in 2019. In 2020, performances were set in Taiwan and later continued to South Korea. In 2021, a documentary called Show Must Go On came out, documenting how the world tour Phantom of the Opera production dealt with the COVID situation and went on stage in South Korea when restrictions were lifted, and Andrew Lloyd Webber's struggle to reopen theatres in the UK.

Film adaptation

A film adaptation, directed by Joel Schumacher and starring Gerard Butler as the Phantom, Emmy Rossum as Christine, Patrick Wilson as Raoul, Minnie Driver as Carlotta, and Miranda Richardson as Madame Giry, opened on 22 December 2004 in the US.

Phantom: The Las Vegas Spectacular
An edited production renamed Phantom: The Las Vegas Spectacular opened 24 June 2006 at The Venetian Las Vegas. The show starred Brent Barrett and Anthony Crivello as the Phantom, Sierra Boggess and Elizabeth Loyacano as Christine, and Tim Martin Gleason as Raoul. The theatre was built specifically for the show to resemble the Opéra Garnier in Paris. The production ran 95 minutes with no intermission, and was directed and choreographed by Harold Prince and Gillian Lynne, with scenic designs by David Rockwell. The show featured updated technology and effects, including a re-engineered chandelier capable of reassembling in midair during the overture while the entire interior of the venue (not merely the stage) returned to its 1880s halcyon days. Almost 45 minutes' worth of material was eliminated, such as the Don Juan Triumphant rehearsal. "Poor Fool, He Makes Me Laugh" while "The Point of No Return" were significantly shortened. Other changes resembled those in the 2004 film, such as staging the chandelier crash at the plot's climax (during performance of "The Point of No Return") rather than mid-story. Due to economic reasons, the Las Vegas production closed on 2 September 2012, after five years and almost 2,700 performances.

Planned French production 
A production was originally planned for the first ever French production in Paris at the Mogador Theatre in September 2016. A few days before the premiere, a fire damaged the stage floor and most of the backdrops and set pieces.

Copyright release
In 2011, the Really Useful Group (copyright owners of Phantom) released certain rights to the musical in celebration of its 25th anniversary. In March 2011 Reed-Custer High School in Braidwood, Illinois, became the first school to perform Phantom under the new rights. Later in 2011, Stanwell School in Penarth became the first school in the UK to perform the show.

Awards and nominations

Original London production

Original Broadway production

Sequel

The sequel to Phantom, written by Lloyd Webber, Ben Elton, Frederick Forsyth and Glenn Slater, is called Love Never Dies. It was loosely adapted from the 1999 novel The Phantom of Manhattan, by Forsyth. Set in 1907 (a decade after the conclusion of Phantom according to the production's announcement, but actually 26 years later, as the original show was set in 1881), Christine is invited to perform at Phantasma, a new attraction at Coney Island, by an anonymous impresario. With her husband Raoul and son Gustave in tow, she journeys to Brooklyn, unaware that it is the Phantom who has arranged her appearance at the popular beach resort.

The original production was directed by Jack O'Brien and choreographed by Jerry Mitchell with set and costume designs by Bob Crowley, and opened at the Adelphi Theatre in the West End on 9 March 2010. Though it ran for over 17 months and closed on 27 August 2011, the production received mixed reviews. A scheduled Broadway opening in November 2010 was postponed until Spring 2011 and later cancelled. A revamped Australian production, starring Ben Lewis and Anna O'Byrne, opened 21 May 2011 at the Regent Theatre in Melbourne to more favourable notices. After the Melbourne run ended on 12 December 2011 the production moved to the Capitol Theatre in Sydney where it played from January to April 2012.

See also
 Phantom
 Love Never Dies
 List of Tony Award- and Olivier Award-winning musicals
 List of best-selling albums in New Zealand
 List of best-selling albums

Notes

External links

 
  (archive)
 
 The Phantom of the Opera (The Guide to Musical Theatre)
 An interview with the makeup designer on the American Theatre Wing's "Working in the Theatre" series.

 
1986 musicals
Musicals based on The Phantom of the Opera
Broadway musicals
Backstage musicals
Musicals by Andrew Lloyd Webber
Laurence Olivier Award-winning musicals
Musicals based on novels
Plays set in the 19th century
West End musicals
Tony Award for Best Musical
British musicals
Sung-through musicals
Tony Award-winning musicals